The 2013 Sarasota Thunder season was the first and only season for the professional indoor football franchise and first in the Ultimate Indoor Football League (UIFL). The Thunder were one of six teams that competed in the UIFL for the 2013 season.

Led by head coach Greg Walls, the Thunder played their entire season as a travel team, based out of Sarasota, Florida.

Schedule
Key:

Regular season
All start times are local to home team

Standings

y - clinched conference title
x - clinched playoff spot

Roster

References

Sarasota Thunder
Sarasota Thunder
Sports in Sarasota County, Florida